The Journal of Teacher Education is a peer-reviewed academic journal that publishes papers in the field of education. The journal's editors are Tonya Bartell, Dorinda Carter Andrews, Robert Floden, and Gail Richmond (Michigan State University). It has been in publication since 1950 and is currently published by SAGE Publications in association with American Association of Colleges for Teacher Education.

Scope 
The mission of the Journal of Teacher Education, the flagship journal of AACTE, is to serve as a research forum for a diverse group of scholars who are invested in the preparation and continued support of teachers and who can have a significant voice in discussions and decision-making around issues of teacher education. One of the fundamental goals of the journal is the use of evidence from rigorous investigation to identify and address the increasingly complex issues confronting teacher education at the national and global levels. These issues include but are not limited to preparing teachers to effectively address the needs of marginalized youth, their families and communities; program design and impact; selection, recruitment and retention of teachers from underrepresented groups; local and national policy; accountability; and routes to certification.

JTE does not publish book reviews, program evaluations or articles solely describing programs, program components, courses or personal experiences. In addition, JTE does not accept manuscripts that are solely about the development or validation of an instrument unless the use of that instrument yields data providing new insights into issues of relevance to teacher education (MSU, February 2016).

Abstracting and indexing 
The Journal of Teacher Education is abstracted and indexed in, among other databases, Sociological Abstracts and the Social Sciences Citation Index. According to the Journal Citation Reports, its 2017 impact factor is 3.18, ranking it 12 out of 238 journals in the category ‘Education & Educational Research’.

References

External links 
 
 AACTE Official website

SAGE Publishing academic journals
English-language journals
5 times per year journals